Lumby is a surname. Notable people with the surname include:

Catharine Lumby, Australian academic, author and journalist
Gary Lumby, British banker
Jeff Lumby, Canadian actor
Jim Lumby, soccer player
Joseph Rawson Lumby (1831–95), English cleric, academic, author and divine
Thomas and Henry Lumby, 18th-century English architects
Walter Lumby, English footballer
Wendy Lumby (born 1966), British alpine skier

See also
Lumbye